Wilhelm Wieben (2 June 1935 – 13 June 2019) was a German journalist, actor and author, best known for presenting the daily news in Tagesschau, the most-watched news program on German television, from 1973 to 1998.

Biography 
Wieben was born in Hennstedt, Dithmarschen. After school he studied theater at Max-Reinhardt-Schule für Schauspiel in Berlin. Later he worked as a journalist for Radio Bremen and was a news presenter on the TV channel ARD in Tagesschau between 1973 and his retirement in 1998. Wieben has authored books in Low German, a regional language in Northern Germany. He is also heard (and briefly seen in the music video) in Falco's controversial hit song Jeanny: The part of the Newsflash in the track is spoken by Wieben.

Inge Meysel outed Wieben as a homosexual in a 1995 interview in the magazine Stern. Before publication, Stern asked for Wieben's permission to publish the interview which he granted.

Works by author, in German 
 Wenn't Abend ward. Heide : Boyens, 1999
 Melodie der Meere. Hamburg : Kabel, 1997
 Mien plattdüütsch Wiehnachtsbook. Heide in Holstein : Boyens, 1993
 Mien plattdüütsch Leesbook. Heide in Holstein :  Boyens, 1986

References

External links 

 Wilhelm Wieben in German National Library

1935 births
2019 deaths
People from Dithmarschen
German television presenters
German male journalists
German television reporters and correspondents
German broadcast news analysts
20th-century German journalists
German gay writers
German LGBT journalists
German LGBT broadcasters
ARD (broadcaster) people
Tagesschau (ARD) presenters and reporters
Radio Bremen people